is a 1970 Japanese animated film.

See also
Sans Famille

References

External links
Chibikko Remi to Meiken Kapi on Toei Animation 

Japanese animated films
1970 anime films
Toei Animation films
Films directed by Yûgo Serikawa